The Tharro Hills are located in Sindh, Pakistan. Important archaeological sites relating to the Amri culture have been discovered in the area.

References

Landforms of Sindh
Hills of Pakistan